Romanian names or Romanian name may refer to:
Romanian name, a given name or surname in Romania
Romanian Names, a 2009 album by John Vanderslice
Name of Romania, etymology of Romania